Atotonilco de Tula is one of the 84 municipalities of Hidalgo.  It is located in the central-southeastern part of the state of Hidalgo in Mexico.  The municipal seat is Atotonilco de Tula. The municipality is located at a southern pass leading out of the Mezquital Valley to 86 kilometers north of Mexico City and about 180 km northeast of the state capital of Pachuca de Soto. The name comes from Nahuatl and means "place of hot springs" and otomi language is Padehe. The municipality covers an area of 31 km².

As of 2010 census, the municipality had a total population of 31,078. It is now part of Tula de Allende built-up (or metro) area.

Geography 

Atotonilco borders. It covers a total surface area of 192.7 km² at an altitude of 6,634 ft. In the year 2010 census by INEGI, it reported a population of 17,055.

The town of Atotonilco de Tula, a municipal seat, has governing jurisdiction over the following communities: Vito, Boxfi, and Progreso. The total municipality extends 96.37 and borders with the municipalities of Tepeji del Río, Tula de Allende, Atitalaquia, Ajacuba and the state of México (Huehuetoca, Tequixquiac and Apaxco).

The municipal seat is in a small, elongated valley but most of the municipality is inside of the Mezquital Valley.

Flora & fauna
Atotonilco de Tula municipality is a rural territory of Central Mexican Plateau, here there is a diversity in plants and animals of semi-desertic climate (Mezquital Valley).

The native animals are cacomistle, skunk, gopher, bobcat, falcon, Virginia opossum, rabbit, Mexican gray squirrel, turkey, colibri, turkey vulture, northern mockingbird, rattlesnake, pine snake, xincoyote, red warbler, rufous-crowned sparrow, lesser roadrunner, great horned owl, frog, toad, red ant, bee, and others.

Demography

Populated places in Atotonilco

References

Municipalities of Hidalgo (state)
Populated places in Hidalgo (state)
Populated places in the Teotlalpan

La Ñeñesita / Mi Peyeyeye / Wefi.com / La Ali Colotas / Los Cerdos / Noticieros 27 / Cakesota / Carmen Y Marilo / Patronilo Y Petronila / Cerdos Vacas Poshi